Mount Carmel College (MCC) is an autonomous college located in Bangalore, India, affiliated to Bengaluru City University. It is one of the first women’s colleges established in 1944 in Trichur as 'Carmel College' under the Madras University and shifted to Bengaluru in 1948. It's ultimate aim is to empower women with the help of education. MCC has been featured on ‘India Today’ since its conception and has continued to claim its ranking as one amongst the top twenty colleges of India every year

Academics and accreditation
The college offers undergraduate, postgraduate and doctoral programmes in arts, science and commerce. The college is Re-Accredited with an A+ Grade(4th Cycle) by NAAC . A College with Potential for Excellence by UGC, Star College Status by DBT, Scientific and Industrial Research Organization (SIRO) by the Department of Scientific and Industrial Research (DSIR), Government of India . The college has a sister institution Mount Carmel Institute Of Management which offers Post Graduation Diploma in Business Management for women. The Centre for Education Growth and Research has declared MCC as the Best Women’s College in Karnataka for its ‘outstanding and exemplary contribution towards education ,skill development and research’.

In 2008, it was ranked by India Today as one of the top three colleges in Karnataka in the fields of arts, science and commerce.

Student festivals 
Cul Ah is the cultural fest of the college that includes events such as dance, drama, music and academically driven contests like quizzes. Cross Currents is a national level Commerce Fest and Carpediem is a national level management fest, along with Manan which is a national level Humanities fest.
These are to name a few of the fests hosted by the college.

Notable alumni

 A. J. S. Lakshmi Shree
 Anjali Jay,  British-Indian actress and classical dancer
 Amulya, actress
 Anu Prabhakar, actress
 Anushka Sharma, actress 
 Anushka Shetty, actress
 Aparna Popat, badminton player
 Deepika Padukone, actress 
 Disha Annappa Ravi, environmental activist
 Evangeline Anderson Rajkumar, theologian
 Faye D'Souza, journalist
 Joanne Da Cunha, Pond's Femina Goa 2013 / Actress, Model, Singer
 Kiran Mazumdar-Shaw, businesswoman, technocrat, innovator, and the founder of Biocon
 Mamta Mohandas, actress and playback singer
 Margaret Alva, governor of Rajasthan and former governor of Uttarakhand
 Monisha Unni, actress
 Nandita Berry, Indian-American attorney, former Secretary of State of Texas
 Nicole Faria - model and Miss Earth 2010
 Nithya Menen, actress
 Nirupama Rao, Indian ambassador to the United States
 Pooja Umashankar, actress 
 Priya Pereira, actress 
 Radhika Pandit, actress
 Rajini Rao, Indian-American Physiologist and Professor at Johns Hopkins University School of Medicine, principal investigator of the Rao Lab
 Roshmitha Harimurthy, Miss Diva-Miss Universe India(2016)
 Sharmiela Mandre, actress
 Vaishali Desai, model and actress, winner of Indian title of Miss International
 Vasundahara Das, singer, actress
 Suparna Rajaram, distinguished Professor of Psychology at Stony Brook University

See also
Mount Carmel College alumni

References

External links
 Official website

Colleges in Bangalore
Educational institutions established in 1948
1948 establishments in India
Carmelite educational institutions
Colleges affiliated to Bangalore University
Catholic universities and colleges in India
Women's universities and colleges in Karnataka
Academic institutions formerly affiliated with the University of Mysore
Academic institutions formerly affiliated with the University of Madras